James Docherty may refer to:
 James Docherty (1950s footballer), Scottish footballer for Queen's Park and Airdrieonians
 James Docherty (1890s footballer), Scottish footballer for Derby County and Luton Town
 Jim Docherty (born 1956), Scottish footballer
 Jamie Docherty (fl. 1900s–1910s), Scottish footballer
 Jimmy Docherty (1931–2014), Scottish rugby union player

See also
James Docharty (1829–1878), Scottish landscape painter